Souk Sidi Sridek  is one of the popular souks of the medina of Tunis. It is specialized in selling daily use products.

Location 
It is located in Sidi Sridek Street in the Hafsia District in the north-east of Al-Zaytuna Mosque.

History 
The souk was founded by Ahmad II in 1940 during the french occupation.
It got refurbished in 2010 under the orders of the mayor of Tunis.

Monuments 
It is situated near the Jewish hood where the madrasa El Achouria and Achour Mosque are located.

Notes and references 

Sidi Sridek